Defending champion Iga Świątek defeated Ons Jabeur in the final, 6–2, 6–2 to win the women's singles tennis title at the 2022 Italian Open. She did not drop a set during the tournament. This was Świątek's fifth consecutive WTA Tour title, and she became the first player to win four WTA 1000 titles in a single season since Serena Williams in 2013. With the win, Świątek extended her winning streak to 28 matches – the longest on the WTA Tour since Serena Williams won 34 consecutive matches in 2013. This was also the first time in her professional career that Świątek defended a title. Jabeur was attempting to be the first player since Serena Williams in 2013 to win consecutive titles in Madrid and Rome; she reached the final after being the match point down in her semifinal match against Daria Kasatkina.

Seeds
The top eight seeds received a bye into the second round.

Draw

Finals

Top half

Section 1

Section 2

Bottom half

Section 3

Section 4

Seeded players
The following are the seeded players, based on WTA rankings as of 25 April 2022. Rankings and points before are as of 9 May 2022.

Because Rome is a non-mandatory event, but players must count, if played, at least two non-mandatory WTA 1000 tournaments on their rankings, points will be adjusted the following way:

 Players who have points from the 2021 tournament counting towards their ranking, will get those points replaced by:
 The points from the 2022 tournament, if they have less than two non-mandatory WTA 1000 events or 16 total tournaments counting towards their ranking.
 The points from the 2022 tournament or their 17th best result, whichever is higher, if they have at least two non-mandatory WTA 1000 events counting towards their ranking.
 Players who don't have points from the 2021 tournament counting towards their ranking, will have their ranking adjusted the following way:
 The points from the 2022 tournament will be added to the players counting less than 16 tournaments towards their ranking.
 The points from the 2022 tournament will replace the 16th best result of the players counting less than two non-mandatory WTA 1000 towards their ranking.
 The points from the 2022 tournament, if higher, will replace the points from the worse non-mandatory WTA 1000 event or the 16th best result, whichever is lower, of the players counting two non-mandatory WTA 1000 events towards their ranking.
 The points from the 2022 tournament, if higher, will replace the 16th best result of the players counting more than two non-mandatory WTA 1000 events towards their ranking.

† Points are from a non-mandatory WTA 1000 event that must count towards the player's ranking.

Withdrawn players
The following player would have been seeded, but withdrew before the tournament began.

Other entry information

Wildcards

Protected ranking

Withdrawals

Qualifying

Seeds

Qualifiers

Lucky losers

Draw

First qualifier

Second qualifier

Third qualifier

Fourth qualifier

Fifth qualifier

Sixth qualifier

Seventh qualifier

Eighth qualifier

References

External links
 Qualifying
 Main draw

Singles women
Italian Open - Singles